The 1925 Holy Cross Crusaders football team was an American football team represented the College of the Holy Cross as an independent during the 1925 college football season.  In its seventh season under head coach Cleo A. O'Donnell, the team compiled an 8–2 record and defeated Harvard for the first time in school history. 

This was the first team to be named the "Holy Cross Crusaders", as the college adopted its first official team name by a vote of the student body in October 1925. "Crusaders" was the overwhelming favorite in a three-way race, with 143 votes, beating "Chiefs" (17) and "Sagamores" (7). The poll was conducted by The Tomahawk, the student weekly newspaper. Though the Tomahawk noted that this was the college's first official athletic nickname, newspapers had been referring to Holy Cross teams as "the Purple" for years.

The team played its home games at Fitton Field on the college campus in Worcester, Massachusetts.

Schedule

References

Holy Cross
Holy Cross Crusaders football seasons
Holy Cross Crusaders football